Victoria, Crown Princess of Sweden, Duchess of Västergötland (Victoria Ingrid Alice Désirée; born 14 July 1977) is the heir apparent to the Swedish throne, as the eldest child of King Carl XVI Gustaf. If she ascends to the throne as expected, she would be Sweden's fourth queen regnant (after Margaret, Christina and Ulrika Eleonora) and the first since 1720. Her inheritance is secured by Sweden's 1979 Act of Succession, the first law in Western Europe to adopt royal absolute primogeniture.

Early life
Victoria was born on 14 July 1977 at 21:45 CET at the Karolinska Hospital in Solna, Stockholm County, Sweden, and is the oldest child of King Carl XVI Gustaf and Queen Silvia. She is a member of the House of Bernadotte. Born as a princess of Sweden, she was designated crown princess in 1979 (SFS 1979:932) ahead of her younger brother. Her place as first in the line of succession formally went into effect on 1 January 1980 with the parliamentary change to the Act of Succession that introduced absolute primogeniture.

Her given name, Victoria Ingrid Alice Désirée, honours various relatives. Her first name comes primarily from her great-great-grandmother Victoria of Baden, queen consort of Sweden. Her other names honour her great-aunt Ingrid of Sweden; her maternal grandmother, Alice Soares de Toledo; her ancestor Désirée Clary, queen consort of Sweden; and her paternal aunt and godmother, Princess Désirée.

She was baptised at the Royal Palace Church on 27 September 1977. Her godparents were Crown Prince Harald of Norway (later king of Norway), her maternal uncle, Ralf Sommerlath, Princess Beatrix of the Netherlands (later queen of the Netherlands, 1980–2013), and her aunt Princess Désirée, Baroness Silfverschiöld. The Crown Princess was confirmed in the summer of 1992 at Räpplinge church on the island of Öland.

Education
Victoria studied for a year (1996–97) at the Catholic University of the West at Angers in France, and in the fall term of 1997 participated in a special program following the work of the Riksdag. From 1998 to 2000, Victoria resided in the United States, where she studied various subjects at Yale University, New Haven, Connecticut.

In May 1999, she was an intern at the Swedish Embassy in Washington, D.C. Victoria completed a study program at the Government Offices in 2001. In 2003, Victoria's education continued with visits to Swedish businesses, a study and intern program in agriculture and forestry, as well as completion of the basic soldier training at SWEDINT (the Swedish Armed Forces International Centre).

In 2006, Victoria enrolled in the Ministry for Foreign Affairs' Diplomat Program, running from September 2006 to June 2007. The program is a training program for young future diplomats and gives an insight to the ministry's work, Swedish foreign and security policies and Sweden's relations with the rest of the world. In June 2009, she graduated with a Bachelor of Arts degree from Uppsala University.

She speaks Swedish, English, French and German.

Change in status 
Victoria was made crown princess on 1 January 1980 by the 1979 amendment to the Act of Succession of 1810 (Successionsordningen). This constitutional amendment introduced absolute primogeniture, meaning that the throne would be inherited by the monarch's eldest child regardless of gender. King Carl XVI Gustaf objected to the reform after it occurred—not because he objected to women entering the line of succession, but because he was upset about his son being stripped of the crown prince status he had held since birth.

When she became heir, she also was made Duchess of Västergötland, one of the historical provinces of Sweden. Prior to this constitutional change, the heir apparent to the throne was her younger brother, Carl Philip. He is now fourth in line to the throne, behind Victoria and her children.

Public life
Victoria's declaration of majority took place in the Hall of State at the Royal Palace of Stockholm on 14 July 1995. As of the day she turned 18, she became eligible to act as Head of State when the King is not in country. Victoria made her first public speech on this occasion. Located on the dais in the background was the same silver throne on which her father was seated at his enthronement, in actual use from 1650 and up until this ceremony.

As heir apparent to the throne, Victoria is a working member of the Swedish Royal Family with her own agenda of official engagements. Victoria attends the regular Advisory Council on Foreign Affairs and the information councils with Government ministers headed by the King, and steps in as a temporary regent (Riksföreståndare) when needed.

Victoria has made many official trips abroad as a representative of Sweden. Her first major official visit on her own was to Japan in 2001, where she promoted Swedish tourism, design, music, gastronomy and environmental sustainability during the "Swedish Style" event. That same year, Victoria also travelled to the West Coast of the United States, where she participated in the celebrations of the Nobel centenary.

In 2002, she paid official visits to United States, Spain, Uganda, Ethiopia, and Kosovo where she visited Camp Victoria. In 2003, she made official visits to Egypt and the United States. In early 2004, she paid an official visit to Saudi Arabia, as a part of a large official business delegation from Sweden, and in October 2004, she travelled to Hungary.

Crown Princess Victoria was given her own household in October 2004. It is headed by the Marshal of the Court, and serves to coordinate the official engagements of The Crown Princess.

In January 2005, Victoria made a long official visit to Australia, promoting Swedish style and businesses, and in April she visited Bangladesh and Sri Lanka to follow aid work and become informed about the work in the aftermath of the tsunami. In April 2005, Victoria made an official visit to Japan where she visited the Expo 2005 in Aichi, laid the foundation for a new IKEA store in Yokohama together with Princess Takamado and met with Emperor Akihito, Empress Michiko, Crown Prince Naruhito and Sayako Kuroda. In June 2005, Victoria travelled to Turkey on an official visit where she participated in the Swedish Business Seminar and Sweden Day celebrations in Ankara during a historic visit, which was organised by the Swedish Embassy in Ankara and Swedish Trade Council in Istanbul. Victoria also visited the historic sights such as the Blue Mosque, Topkapı Palace and Hagia Sophia. This was the first official Royal visit from Sweden to Turkey since 1934. In September 2005, she made an official visit to China.

In March 2006, Victoria made an official visit to Brazil where she followed the Volvo Ocean Race and visited projects supported by the World Childhood Foundation, such as the Abrigo Rainha Sílvia. In December, she paid a four-day official visit to Paris where she attended a French-Swedish soirée arranged by the Swedish Chamber of Commerce, the Swedish Trade Council and the Swedish Embassy, during which she also awarded the Prix d’Excellence 2006. The visit to Paris also included events with the Swedish Club in Paris, attendance at a church service in the Sofia Church (the Swedish church in Paris), a study visit to the OECD headquarters and meetings with the Secretary-General José Ángel Gurría, the Swedish Ambassador to the OECD, Gun-Britt Andersson, and other senior officials. She also attended a gala dinner hosted by La Fondation Pour L’Enfance at Versailles.

She is a member of the Honorary Board of the International Paralympic Committee.

In 2011, it was announced that Victoria would continue working throughout her pregnancy. In 2012, she took her maternity leave one day prior to the birth of her daughter Estelle and her husband Daniel revealed that he would take his paternity leave and switch parental roles with Victoria when Estelle began preschool.

In January 2016, UN Secretary General Ban Ki-moon appointed The Crown Princess as a member of Sustainable Development Goals Advocates for Agenda 2030. The Crown Princess is therefore one of 16 ambassadors in the Sustainable Development Goals (SDG) Advocacy Group. The group's task is to promote the UN's Sustainable Development Goals – Agenda 2030 – in various ways. The Crown Princess primarily works with issues concerning water and health.

The Crown Princess Victoria's Fund

The Crown Princess Victoria's Fund was set up in 1997 and is run as a part of Radiohjälpen, the fundraising branch of Sveriges Television and Sveriges Radio. The fund's aim is to provide support for leisure and recreational activities for children and young people with functional disabilities or chronic illnesses.

The Crown Princess Victoria Fund's means mainly derive from donations by the public, but large companies such as Arla Foods, Swedbank and AB Svenska Returpack are constant sponsor partners. Additional support comes from The Association of Swedish Bakers & Confectioners who every year arrange a national “princess cake week” during which the participating cafés and bakeries give 2.50 SEK per sold princess pastry and 10 SEK per sold princess cake to the fund. The result of this fund-raising drive is usually presented to Victoria herself on her name day on 12 March every year; in 2007, the total amount was 200,000 SEK. Congratulatory and memorial cards are also issued by Radiohjälpen benefitting the fund, a simple way to pay respects and do a good deed in one act. In 2006, The Crown Princess Victoria Fund raised a total of 5.5 million SEK.

Every year Victoria visits one or several clubs or projects that have been granted money. These visits are not announced via the official royal diary but kept private; instead Sveriges Television often accompanies her and airs short programs from these visits at some time during the year.

Personal life

Victoria's first boyfriend was Daniel Collert. They socialised in the same circles, went to the same school and were already friends when their romance developed in the mid-1990s. When Victoria moved to the United States in 1998 to study and recover from her eating disorders, Collert moved with her and settled in New York. In September 2000, Victoria's relationship with Collert was confirmed in an interview with her at Expo 2000. The relationship ended in 2001.

In May 2002, Swedish newspaper Expressen reported that Victoria had a new boyfriend, her personal trainer at Master Training, Daniel Westling. When the news broke and the media turned its attention on him, it was obvious that he did not like being in the public eye. Once Westling was photographed crossing a street against a red light in order to avoid a camera. In July 2002, Victoria and Westling were pictured kissing for the first time at a birthday party for Caroline Kreuger, a close friend of Victoria's.

In a popular personal report called Tre dagar med Victoria, which profiled her work during a three-day period that aired on TV4 in December 2004, Victoria commented on criticism directed at Westling, "Many unfair things are written. I understand that there is speculation, but some day justice will be done there, too." Victoria also gave her opinion that happiness is important, and that these days it is not so much about background and pedigree but about two people who have to live with each other. She said that if they are not happy and comfortable with each other, it is impossible to do a good job.

Engagement
Swedish media often speculated about upcoming engagements and marriages for Victoria. On 24 February 2009, rumours that wedding plans were imminent became particularly intense preceding an information council between the King and Prime Minister Fredrik Reinfeldt. Under the terms of the Swedish Act of Succession, the Government, upon the request of the King, gives the final consent for a dynastic marriage of a prince or princess of Sweden. The prince or princess otherwise loses their right to the throne. Later that day, it was confirmed that permission had been granted and that Victoria would marry Westling in the summer of 2010. The wedding date was set in Stockholm Cathedral for 19 June 2010, the 34th anniversary of her parents' marriage. Her engagement ring features a solitaire round brilliant-cut diamond mounted on white gold.

Marriage, motherhood and children 

The wedding took place on 19 June 2010. Guests including royalty and ambassadors from various countries were invited to the wedding ceremony which took place at Stockholm Cathedral. After the wedding the newlyweds were driven through Stockholm in a coach and then rowed in the antique royal barge Vasaorden to the royal palace where the wedding banquet was held. On the evening before the wedding, there was a gala concert dedicated to the couple in the Stockholm Concert Hall.

On 23 February 2012, Victoria gave birth to Princess Estelle, Duchess of Östergötland, in the Karolinska University Hospital. Their second child, Prince Oscar, Duke of Skåne, was born on 2 March 2016 in Karolinska University Hospital.

Health
Victoria has dyslexia, as do her father King Carl XVI Gustaf and her brother Prince Carl Philip.

In 1996, it was established that Victoria had anorexia; this was not confirmed until the next year. Victoria had planned to study at Uppsala University, but after intense media speculation and public discussion when pictures of an evidently emaciated Victoria in sleeveless dresses at the Order of the Innocence's ball and the gala dinner for the incoming state visit from Austria surfaced in April 1997, the Royal Court decided to confirm her condition.

After a press release from the Royal Court in November 1997 announced that Victoria had eating disorders, she moved to the United States where she received professional treatment and studied at Yale University.

In June 1999, Victoria said, "It was a really hard time. This kind of illness is hard, not only for the individual but also for the people close to him or her. Today I'm fine."

In November 2002, the book Victoria, Victoria! came out, speaking further about her eating disorder. Victoria said: "I felt like an accelerating train, going right down... during the whole period. I had eating disorders and was aware of it, my anguish was enormous. I really hated how I looked like, how I was... I, Victoria, didn't exist. It felt like everything in my life and around me was controlled by others. The one thing I could control was the food I put in me". She further said that "What happened cost and I was the one who stood for the payments. Now I'm feeling well and with the insights I've acquired through this I can hopefully help someone else".

Victoria has prosopagnosia, which makes it difficult to recognize familiar faces.

 In an interview in 2008, she called it a "big drawback" in her capacity as heir to the throne.

Titles, styles and honours

Titles
14 July 1977 – 31 December 1979: Her Royal Highness Princess Victoria of Sweden
1 January 1980 – 9 January 1980: Her Royal Highness The Crown Princess of Sweden 
9 January 1980 – present: Her Royal Highness The Crown Princess of Sweden, Duchess of Västergötland

Honours

National

 :
 Member Grand Cross with Collar of the Royal Order of the Seraphim (LoK av KMO)
 Member of the Royal Family Decoration of King Carl XVI Gustaf (14 July 1995)
 Recipient of the King Carl XVI Gustaf's Jubilee Commemorative Medal III (30 April 2016)
 Recipient of the King Carl XVI Gustaf's Jubilee Commemorative Medal II (23 August 2013)
 Recipient of the King Carl XVI Gustaf's Jubilee Commemorative Medal (30 April 1996)
Swedish National Defence College Commemorative Medal (Försvarshögskolans minnesmedalj) (9 January 2008)
Swedish Soldiers Homes Association Medal in Gold no 1 (Svenska Soldathemsförbundets medalj i guld, SSHFGM) (May 2021)

Foreign
 :
  Grand Decoration of Honour in Gold with Sash of the Decoration of Honour for Services to the Republic of Austria
 :
 Knight Grand Cross of the Order of Leopold
 :
 Grand Cross of the Order of the Southern Cross
 :
 Grand Cross of the Order of the Balkan Mountains
 :
 Grand Cross of the Order of Merit
 :
 Knight of the Order of the Elephant (14 July 1995)
 :
 Grand Cross of the Order of the Cross of Terra Mariana
 Grand Cross of the Order of the White Star
 :
 Grand Cross with Collar of the Order of the White Rose
 :
 Grand Cross of the National Order of Merit
 :
 Grand Cross 1st Class of the Order of Merit of the Federal Republic of Germany
 :
 Grand Cross of the Order of Honour
 :
 Grand Cross of the Order of the Falcon
:
 Grand Cross of the Order of Merit of the Italian Republic
 :
 Knight Grand Cordon of the Order of the Chrysanthemum
 :
 Grand Cordon of the Supreme Order of the Renaissance
 :
 Grand Officer of the Order of the Three Stars
 :
 Grand Cross of the Order of Grand Duke Gediminas
 :
 Knight Grand Cross of the Order of Adolphe of Nassau 
 :
 Honorary Grand Commander of the Order of the Defender of the Realm
 :
 Knight of the Order of Grimaldi
 Recipient of the Prince Albert II Investiture Medal
 :
  Grand Cross of the Order of the Netherlands Lion (11 October 2022)
 :
 Grand Cross of the Order of St. Olav (1 July 1995)
 :
 Grand Cross of the Order of the Star of Romania
 :
 Grand Cross of the Order of Diplomatic Service Merit
 :
 Knight Grand Cross of the Order of Isabella the Catholic (16 November 2021)
 :
 Grand Officer of the Order of the Republic

See also 
 List of current heirs apparent

References

External links

 The Royal Court's official biography in Swedish and English
 The Royal Court's press release about the Diplomat Program
 Radiohjälpen's official website for Victoria Fund
 , Announcement of Victoria and Daniel Westling's engagement, 2009-02-24.

1977 births
Living people
Crown Princesses of Sweden
Swedish princesses
Swedish duchesses
Dukes of Västergötland

Recipients of the Decoration for Services to the Republic of Austria
Recipients of the Grand Decoration with Sash for Services to the Republic of Austria
Recipients of the Order of the Cross of Terra Mariana, 1st Class
Recipients of the Order of the White Star, 1st Class
Grand Cross of the Ordre national du Mérite
Grand Crosses Special Class of the Order of Merit of the Federal Republic of Germany
Grand Crosses of the Order of Honour (Greece)
Recipients of the Order of the Falcon
Knights Grand Cross of the Order of the Falcon
Order of the Precious Crown members
Recipients of the Order of the Lithuanian Grand Duke Gediminas
Grand Crosses of the Order of the Lithuanian Grand Duke Gediminas
Officers of the Order of Grimaldi
Grand Crosses of the Order of the Star of Romania
Yale University alumni
Uppsala University people
Uppsala University alumni
People educated at Enskilda Gymnasiet
Swedish military personnel
People from Solna Municipality
Swedish Lutherans
Swedish socialites
Heirs apparent
Female heirs apparent
Swedish people of German descent
Swedish people of Brazilian descent
Swedish people of Portuguese descent
Swedish people of French descent
20th-century Swedish women
21st-century Swedish women
Royalty and nobility with dyslexia
Daughters of kings